Dolicholepta is a genus of thrips in the family Phlaeothripidae.

Species
 Dolicholepta brevituba
 Dolicholepta flaviantennatus
 Dolicholepta ghesquierei
 Dolicholepta gutierrezi
 Dolicholepta inquilinus
 Dolicholepta jeanneli
 Dolicholepta karnyi
 Dolicholepta micrura
 Dolicholepta nigripes
 Dolicholepta proximius
 Dolicholepta scotti

References

Phlaeothripidae
Thrips
Thrips genera